Alexis Gabrielle Dziena (born July 8, 1984) is an American actress.

Early life 
Dziena was born in New York City and is of Irish, Italian and Polish descent. She attended the private Saint Ann's School alongside her Bringing Rain (2003) costar, Paz de la Huerta. She spent many of her summers growing up in the small South Jersey shore town of Sea Isle City. Also, during high school, she attended classes at the American Academy of Dramatic Arts and appeared in plays there as well.

Career

Television
Dziena made her acting debut in TNT's Witchblade (2002). Guest roles followed in other series, such as Law & Order, Law & Order: Special Victims Unit, and Joan of Arcadia. One of her first major roles was in the Lifetime channel original film She's Too Young (2004), in which she portrayed a sexually active teenager. In the ABC television series Invasion, she played the sheriff's daughter, Kira Underlay.  Dziena also appeared frequently on the sixth season of the HBO series Entourage (2009).

Feature films
Dziena had a small role in the movie Broken Flowers (2005), starring Bill Murray, where she played Lolita, the daughter of a character played by Sharon Stone. She played Heather, a sexually-frustrated young woman who takes part in a couple-swap to save her relationship as part of an experimental therapy in the film Sex and Breakfast (2007). She also co-starred in the films Fool's Gold (2008) and Nick and Norah's Infinite Playlist (2008).

In 2022, Without Ward was released; however, Dziena shot her scenes for the film in 2012.

Personal life
Dziena was in an on-and-off relationship with Michael Pitt from 2000 to 2004. They appeared together in Joey Ramone's music video for What a Wonderful World in 2002.

In September 2011, Dziena attempted to get a restraining order against her parents, claiming that she was living in fear of them resorting to "murder or violence" to access her money. Her request was declined by a judge later that month as she had insufficient evidence to support her allegations.

In June 2014, Dziena's ex-boyfriend Jeffrey Francis Ausley was granted a restraining order against Dziena after she showed up at his house with a bag of clothes and announced that she was moving in. Ausley also alleged that she threatened to harm both of them if he ended their relationship.

Filmography

Music video

References

External links

 
 

1984 births
Living people
American film actresses
American television actresses
American people of Irish descent
American people of Polish descent
American people of Italian descent
People from Sea Isle City, New Jersey
21st-century American actresses
Actresses from New Jersey
Actresses from New York City
Saint Ann's School (Brooklyn) alumni